Zajeziorze may refer to the following places:
Zajeziorze, Gmina Kikół in Kuyavian-Pomeranian Voivodeship (north-central Poland)
Zajeziorze, Gmina Skępe in Kuyavian-Pomeranian Voivodeship (north-central Poland)
Zajeziorze, Świętokrzyskie Voivodeship (south-central Poland)
Zajeziorze, Subcarpathian Voivodeship (south-east Poland)